Talouselämä (Finnish: Economic Life) is a Finnish language weekly financial and business magazine published in Helsinki, Finland. It has been in circulation since 1938.

History and profile
Talouselämä was established by Finnish businessmen in 1938. The magazine is published weekly by Talentum Media Oy. The company also publishes Tekniikka ja Talous.

The headquarters of Talouselämä is in Helsinki. Until the 1980s it was the only dominant business weekly in the country. The magazine provides financial news, including the origins and possible impacts of financial events. It also publishes reviews and research about Finnish companies and society. The magazine has several supplements, including Talouselämä Uratie.

In December 2010 Talouselämä started a lifestyle magazine, Talouselämä Platinum, which is delivered to its subscribers.

Pekka Seppanes served as the editor-in-chief of the magazine. From 2000 to 2008 Terho Puustinen served in the post. Reijo Ruokanen was named editor-in-chief in September 2010. In August 2013 he also became the editor-in-chief of Fakta, another magazine published by Talentum.

Circulation

See also
List of magazines in Finland

References

External links
 

1938 establishments in Finland
Business magazines published in Finland
Finnish-language magazines
Magazines established in 1938
Magazines published in Helsinki
Weekly magazines published in Finland